John William Boyd (September 15, 1811January 28, 1892) was an American businessman and politician.  He served four sessions in the Wisconsin State Senate (1848, 1849, 1858, 1859) representing Walworth County.

Biography
Boyd was born on September 15, 1811, in Charlton, New York. Boyd's father had been a member of the New York legislature. He moved to Wisconsin in 1844, settling in Geneva, Wisconsin. Boyd married three times. His first wife died after a year of marriage. In 1842, he married Wealthy H. Hathaway. They had three children before she died. In 1858, he married Persis A. Buell. They also had three children. He was a Congregationalist and was a member of the Sons of Temperance. Boyd suffered a stroke on January 24, 1892, and died four days later at his home in Linn, Wisconsin.

Career
Boyd was a member of the Senate twice. First, from 1848 to 1849, as a Democrat; and second, from 1858 to 1859, as a Republican.

References

External links
Ancestry.com
The Political Graveyard

|-

People from Charlton, New York
American Congregationalists
19th-century Congregationalists
People from Geneva, Wisconsin
Republican Party Wisconsin state senators
1811 births
1892 deaths
19th-century American politicians
Sons of Temperance